The 2022 cannabis legalization framework is a regulatory framework that would legalize cannabis in Germany. An Eckpunktepapier ("cornerstone paper", or framework paper) was introduced on October 26, 2022 by Minister of Health and member of the Bundestag, Karl Lauterbach, who is a physician and epidemiologist trained in the United States and Germany.

History 
Legislation toward legalization was introduced by the Greens in 2015 as Entwurf eines Cannabiskontrollgesetzes (German cannabis control bill).

The 2022 deregulation proposal was leaked around October 19, 2022.

Provisions
Provisions of the October 2022 framework paper include sales in licensed establishments, and personal possession by adults over 18 years of 20 to 30 grams of cannabis without THC content limit. There may be sales limitations regarding persons under 21 years of age.

Effect
The ministry document is intended to have direct effect under Directive (EU) 2015/1535. Germany will present the framework paper to the European Union before implementing legislation.

Reception 
The issuance of the draft regulations by Ministry of Health was called "decisive step toward legalization" by Politico.

Deutscher Hanfverband criticized a 15% THC limit in the leaked draft.

See also
Cannabis in Germany
Drug policy of Germany
Legality of cannabis

References

Further reading

2022 in Germany
Law of Germany
Proposed laws
Cannabis in Germany